Aku Kestilä (born 9 June 1994) is a Finnish professional ice hockey player. He is currently playing for Oulun Kärpät of the Finnish Liiga.

Kestilä made his Liiga debut playing with Oulun Kärpät during the 2014–15 Liiga season.

References

External links
 

1994 births
Living people
Finnish ice hockey forwards
Oulun Kärpät players